ELT may refer to:

Education 
 English language teaching
 Expanded learning time, an American education strategy
 Kolb's experiential learning theory

Mathematics and science 
 Ending lamination theorem
 Extremely large telescope, a type of telescope
 Extremely Large Telescope, an astronomical observatory under construction in Chile
 Effective lifetime temperature, used in rehydroxylation dating

Medicine 
 Endovenous laser treatment
 Euglobulin lysis time
 Excimer laser trabeculostomy

Music 
 Every Little Thing (band), a Japanese J-Pop band
 "ELT",  a song by the band Wilco from their 1999 album Summerteeth

Technology 
 Emergency locator transmitter
 Extract, load, transform, a data processing concept
 End-of-life tyre

Transport 
 East London Transit, a British public transport system
 El Tor Airport, in Egypt
 Elizabethtown station, Pennsylvania

Other uses 
 Electrical lighting technician, a stage-lighting technician
 Electronic lien and title
 Elt Drenth (1949–1998), Dutch swimmer
 Evolutionary leadership theory
 Executive Leadership Team